

Events
25 January – Richard Morecroft reads his last ABC News bulletin. He is replaced the following Monday by Tony Eastley.
4 February – Nine cast members from All Saints participate in The Weakest Link: All Saints Special to mark the first and only anniversary of The Weakest Link in Australia. Erik Thomson wins the special, but his winnings are unknown.
11 February – The Nine Network's post-Sale of the Century replacement, Shafted hosted by former Hey Hey It's Saturday member Red Symons premieres. After dismal ratings the show is cancelled in April the same year. On the same day the network's post-Burgo's Catch Phrase replacement Pass the Buck, a new game show based on the UK game show containing a word association premieres leading into Nine's most-watched 6pm news bulletin, After dismal ratings the show is cancelled in May the same year.
11 March – The Seven Network's Docklands studios in Melbourne open, with the first Seven News Melbourne news bulletin being broadcast from the centre. This leads to a national relaunch of the Seven News brand with new sets and graphics in most cities. Also on that day, the nine remaining contestants from the third season of The Mole take part in a special episode of The Weakest Link for a chance to add $100,000 to the prize kitty. The team performed well against expectations, winning only $14,100, the lowest amount ever won on the Australian version of the show. On The Mole, this figure is rounded up to $15,000. The show was cancelled one month later after dismal ratings.
6 March – Foxtel introduces a new sports channel called Fox Footy Channel. It runs until 1 October 2006.
20 March – Tim Lane resigns from the Nine Network following a disagreement in regards to commentating AFL matches with Eddie McGuire involving the Collingwood Football Club. Lane defects to rival Network Ten in 2003, where he remained until Ten lost the rights at the end of 2011.
28 March – The Nine Network televises its first AFL game until Nine lost the TV rights at the end of 2006.
30 March – The Western Front premieres on Network Ten in Perth and was hosted by Tim Gossage and Lachy Reid.
30 March – Network Ten televises its first AFL game until Ten lost the TV rights at the end of 2011.
8 April – Frasier returns to the Nine Network and the show debuts its 7:00 pm weeknight timeslot.
8 April – Australian media analysis television program Media Watch returns to air on the ABC several months after the broadcaster had removed its former managing director Jonathan Shier with David Marr taking over as host as Paul Barry had been sacked by Shier in 2000 following its cancellation.
24 April – Crystal-Rose Cluff wins the third season of The Mole, taking home $108,000 in prize money. Alaina Taylor is revealed as the Mole, and Marc Jongebloed is the runner-up.
2 May – Final episode of the Australian drama series (which is the very first television series in Australia to be filmed in widescreen) Something in the Air airs on ABC.
16 May – Kath & Kim premieres on the ABC and is a surprise hit. It was picked up by the Seven Network in 2007.
1 July – Peter Corbett wins the second season of Big Brother.
2 July – American science fiction fantasy series Smallville premieres on the Nine Network.
26 July – Mixy ends after 4-year run and it will be replaced by children's weekday morning and afternoon blocks on the ABC.
6 August – Eddie McGuire and Catriona Rowntree present an all new IQ test television series called Test Australia: The National IQ Test which is airing on Nine Network. It has also been ranked as the most watched television show for 2002 in Australia.
8 August – The American action drama series 24 premieres on the Seven Network.
 12 August – 
After being cancelled in 2001, Burgo's Catch Phrase relaunches on the Nine Network and is a surprise hit, with new graphics, new theme music and new prizes with the contestant backdrop increased to three people with the game show been produced by Southern Star Endemol, leading into Nine's most-watched 6pm news bulletin.
TV and radio personality Dylan Lewis is voted winner of Celebrity Big Brother.
The Australian drama White Collar Blue premieres on Network Ten.
September – SBS launches its first Digital channel, the SBS World News Channel.
1 September – The Nine Network undergoes a revamp to change their on-air graphics, including changing their dots back to spears as well as the numeral becoming 3D for the colour-coded days.
30 September – The Wiggles return to television with a brand new television series called Lights, Camera, Action, Wiggles! airing for the first time ever on ABC.
4 October – Beyblade premieres on Fox Kids and two weeks later on Network Ten as part of Cheez TV. Also that day, David Koch takes over from Chris Reason as co-host of Sunrise, a role which he still holds as of today.
29 November – Brian Henderson retires from reading Sydney's National Nine News after four decades. He is replaced the following Monday by Jim Waley, who manages to keep the bulletin on top of the ratings in Sydney for the next two years.

Channels

New channels

 6 March – Fox Footy Channel

Defunct channels
 30 November – Oh! (replaced by FOX8 on Optus Television)

Premieres

Domestic series

International series

Subscription television

Domestic

International

Specials

Free-to-air premieres
This is a list of programs which made their premiere on Australian free-to-air television that had previously premiered on Australian subscription television. Programs may still air on the original subscription television network.

International

Subscription premieres
This is a list of programs which made their premiere on Australian subscription television that had previously premiered on Australian free-to-air television. Programs may still air on the original free-to-air television network.

Domestic

International

Changes to network affiliation
This is a list of programs which made their premiere on an Australian television network that had previously premiered on another Australian television network. The networks involved in the switch of allegiances are predominantly both free-to-air networks or both subscription television networks. Programs that have their free-to-air/subscription television premiere, after previously premiering on the opposite platform (free-to air to subscription/subscription to free-to air) are not included. In some cases, programs may still air on the original television network. This occurs predominantly with programs shared between subscription television networks.

Domestic

International

Ending / Resting this year

See also
 2002 in Australia
 List of Australian films of 2002

References